This is a list of mayors of Yellowknife, Northwest Territories, Canada

List
John McNiven 1953–1954
Gordon A. Allen 1954–1955
Fred W. Henne 1956–1957
Ted Horton 1958–1963
John Parker 1964 – February 1967
C. M. "Chet" Wilkinson March – December 1967
Fred W. Henne 1968–1973
Robert M. Findlay 1974–1975
Fred W. Henne 1976–1979
Michael Ballantyne 1980–1983
Don Sian 1984–1985
Michael McGrath 1986–1987
Pat McMahon 1988–1994
David Lovell 1994–2000
Gordon Van Tighem 2000–2012
Mark Heyck 2012–2018
Rebecca Alty 2018–present

Election results

2018

2015

2012

2009

2006

2003

2000

References 

Yellowknife
 
Mayors of Yellowknife
Mayors of Yellowknife